Bloom is a 2021 Indian Tamil-language short film directed by Richard Anthony, starring Mitra Visvesh and Ashwin Raam. The plot focuses on the romance between two different people, set in Chennai against the backdrop of COVID-19 lockdown in India in March 2020. The short film featured music by Hari Madras Rengarajan, cinematography handled by Niketh Bommireddy and edited by Sangathamizhan E. It was distributed by Mani Ratnam's production house Madras Talkies, and the film released on 19 May 2021 through YouTube.

Plot 
Mitra, an artist and Ashwin, a budding musician reside in the same street in Chennai. After a nationwide lockdown to curb COVID-19 pandemic was imposed in March 2020, Ashwin started connecting virtually with Mitra and they develop a special bond within each other as they start exploring each other's life. They experience all kinds of emotions such as love, happiness, fun, excitement, guilt, jitters, confusion, loneliness, silence, through their relationship in the lockdown phase. The rest of the story is about their virtual relationship and how Mitra met Ashwin in person, for the first time.

Cast 

 Mitra Visvesh as Mitra
 Ashwin Raam as Ashwin
Kaber Vasuki as The God (narrator; voice-only)

Soundtrack 

The music for the film is composed by Hari Madras Rengarajan and the short also featured poems written and recited by Kaber Vasuki. The original soundtrack album featured thirteen tracks composed by Rengarajan and his music band Sonocosm, and was released in its entirety on 7 June 2021 through Spotify, iTunes and Apple Music.

Marketing and release 
Madras Talkies announced the distribution of the short film and presented the first look through their social media handles on 10 May 2021. The film was released on 19 May 2021.

Reception 
Asuthosh Mohan of Film Companion South reviewed "It’s not so much a denial of reality than a suggestion that films that help you cope are not necessarily an escape from reality. The pandemic, after all, plays God in Bloom." Avinash Ramachandran of Cinema Express wrote "There is no right or wrong in Bloom because it is set in a space where the lines can actually be blurred, and no one would bat an eyelid. Just like most things in the world, the beauty and the not-so-beautiful parts of Bloom squarely lies in the eyes of the beholder."

References

External links 

 

2021 romance films
2021 short films
Films about the COVID-19 pandemic
Films impacted by the COVID-19 pandemic
2020s Tamil-language films
Indian short films
Indian romance films